Caprice Bourret (born October 24, 1971) is an American businesswoman, singer, model, actress, and television personality. She lives in London where she runs her company, By Caprice.

Early life and education 
Bourret attended the co-ed Catholic Bishop Amat Memorial High School in La Puente, California, and graduated class of 1989.

Modelling
Bourret has appeared on more than 250 magazine covers including Vogue, GQ, Cosmopolitan, Esquire, Maxim, FHM, Playboy, and the Swimsuit Issue of Sports Illustrated. She was named the world's sexiest woman by the News of the World, GQs Woman of the Year, and Maxims International Woman of the Year in three consecutive years. She has been featured in television ad campaigns for Diet Coke and Pizza Hut.

Business
In 2000, Bourret entered into a licensing agreement with one of the UK's leading department stores, Debenhams, for the use of her name on a lingerie range. Six years later, she bought back the licence and subsequently founded By Caprice Products, selling internationally to retailers and department stores. She designs, models, and markets lingerie, swimwear, and sleepwear.
In 2010, Bourret launched Bedding By Caprice. Bourret has given speeches at business events about the development of her own business, and on topics of general business interest.

Film and television
Caprice starred in the films Hollywood Flies, Nailing Vienna and Jinxed In Love, all produced for HBO. She also appeared in the British soap operas Hollyoaks and Dream Team and the comedy series Hospital. In 1998, Bourret hosted another British television series, Caprice's Travels. The show followed Bourret's tour through several major holiday destinations. Bourret has appeared on Friday Night's All Wright and several award shows, including the European MTV awards and the World Music Awards, the British National Television Awards in 1996, 1997, and 1998, and several series for the television channels VH1 and E! Entertainment Television. In 2000, she featured in the Channel 4 documentary Being Caprice, in which a hidden camera recorded her life for ten days. Also that year, she hosted an evening at The Oscars and the red carpet event for the American Music Awards both of which were broadcast live on ABC Network.

Bourret was set to take part in the second season of Celebrity Big Brother UK, but pulled out. She later appeared on the third season of Celebrity Big Brother. She continued to make appearances on its companion series Big Brother's Little Brother until 2010.

Bourret was a cast member on the fifth season of the VH1 reality series The Surreal Life and appeared in other reality shows including Celebrities Under Pressure, Celebrities Disfigured, Three Celebrities and a Baby, and Road Raja. In June 2006, she starred in the British independent film Perfect Woman. This followed an earlier appearance in the film The Man with Rain in His Shoes alongside Penélope Cruz. In 2007, Bourret was a judge on Sky One's Project Catwalk and Britain's Next Top Model. Three years later she was head judge on TV3's show Style Wars in Ireland. On November 13, 2008, she came joint second with Jimmy Osmond in a Celebrity Come Dine with Me episode that also featured Nicky Clarke and Nancy Sorrell. In 2017, Bourret competed in series 4 of Channel 4's The Jump.

In 2014, Caprice starred in the reality show Ladies of London.

In September 2019, Bourret competed in the second season of the 5Star reality series Celebs on the Farm, in which she finished as a runner-up. In January 2020, Bourret competed in the twelfth season of Dancing on Ice with professional partner Hamish Gaman. Oscar Peter later replaced Gaman as Bourret's partner before they withdrew from the competition a week later.

Theatre 
Bourret played Maureen in the musical Rent at The Prince of Wales Theatre. She also performed in The Vagina Monologues at the Arts Theatre in London's West End.

In 2007, Bourret produced and played the lead role of Lisa, in the off-Broadway production Debbie Does Dallas: The Musical at the Tesson Theatre in Johannesburg.

Music
In 1999, Bourret was signed to Virgin Records and subsequently released her first single, "Oh Yeah" (UK No. 24), and the 2001 follow-up single, "Once Around the Sun" (also UK No. 24).

References

External links

 
 
 

Female models from California
American television actresses
American television hosts
American film actresses
American stage actresses
American pop artists
American fashion businesspeople
Actresses from California
1971 births
Living people
People from Hacienda Heights, California
American expatriates in England
American women television presenters
Participants in American reality television series
Big Brother (British TV series) contestants
21st-century American women